Alma Hirsig Bliss (1875 –  1959) was an American miniature painter. Her work is included in the collections of the Smithsonian American Art Museum and the Brooklyn Museum.

Bliss studied with Willard Metcalf, Robert Reid, and Volk and Theodora Thayer in New York and with René-Xavier Prinet, Gustave-Claude-Etienne Courtois, and Gabrielle Debillemont-Chardon, the President of the Société des Femmes Peintres et Sculpteurs and of the Société des Miniaturistes et des Arts Precieux, in Paris.

References

1875 births
19th-century American women artists
20th-century American women artists
Portrait miniaturists
Artists in the Smithsonian American Art Museum collection
1950s deaths
Swiss emigrants to the United States